Field Hockey at the 2016 South Asian Games was scheduled to be held in Guwahati, India from 10 – 15 February 2016.

Medalists

Medal table

Draw
Due to very few number of participation countries both Men's and Women's event were played in round-robin with a final format. India picked an inexperienced team of training camp players for the men's event.

References

External links
Official website

2016 South Asian Games
Events at the 2016 South Asian Games
2016
South Asian Games
2016 South Asian Games